Nemadoras is a genus of thorny catfishes native to tropical South America.

Species
There are currently 4 recognized species in this genus:
 Nemadoras cristinae Sabaj Pérez, Arce H., Sousa & Birindelli, 2014 
 Nemadoras elongatus Boulenger, 1898
 Nemadoras hemipeltis C. H. Eigenmann, 1925
 Nemadoras humeralis Kner, 1855

References

Doradidae
Fish of South America
Catfish genera
Taxa named by Carl H. Eigenmann
Freshwater fish genera